Newmarket GO Station is a train station in the GO Transit network located in the Old Davis Tannery Centre on the north side of Davis Drive East in  Newmarket, Ontario, Canada, and is a stop on the Barrie line train service. It is a little over two kilometres east of the Newmarket Bus Terminal, at Davis Drive West and Eagle Street, which is a terminus for GO Bus, York Region Transit and Viva BRT services.

History

In 1853 the Ontario, Simcoe and Huron Railway opened the line between Toronto and Collingwood which was acquired by the Grand Trunk Railway in 1888 and later merged into the Canadian National Railway.

Newmarket railway station was built on the south side of Davis Drive by the Grand Trunk Railway in 1900. The original NRC station was subsequently repurposed as a freight shed.
The second station building is a one-storey wood clad stick frame building with board and batten siding associated with the Carpenter Gothic style.  The west side has a projecting bay window flanked by waiting rooms, originally the south room for women and the north room for men.

The station building was designated a municipal heritage building in 1987 under the Ontario Heritage Act, and as a federal heritage building in 1992 under the Heritage Railway Stations Protection Act.

The GO Transit Barrie line is now owned by Metrolinx and the historic Grand Trunk Railway station is owned by the Town of Newmarket.

A platform extension and repair project began in March 2014. It also includes the rehabilitation of the parking lot, a new ticket booth with a customer waiting area and improved accessibility features.

Services

Newmarket station has weekday service consisting of 10 trains southbound to Union Station in the morning, a train northbound to Bradford in the early afternoon, 7 trains northbound to Allandale Waterfront Station in the afternoon and 2 trains northbound to Bradford in the evening and night.  At other times, GO bus route 68 operates hourly between Barrie Bus Terminal and Aurora GO Station where passengers can connect to the all-day train service to Toronto.

Weekend train service consists of 3 trains southbound to Union station in the morning and 3 trains returning northbound in the afternoon and evening.  At other times, the station is served by GO bus route 68 which operates hourly between Barrie Bus Terminal and Aurora GO station, where passengers can transfer to the all-day weekend train service toward Toronto.

Connecting buses
All buses serve the GO station from bus stops on Davis Drive and Main Street.

York Region Transit:
 50 Queensway
 54 Bayview
 55 Davis Drive
 Viva Yellow

GO Transit:
65 Union Station Bus Terminal/Aurora GO Station/East Gwillimbury GO Station
65B Union Station Bus Terminal/East Gwillimbury GO Station
68 Aurora GO Station/East Gwillimbury GO Station/Barrie Bus Terminal

References

External links

 CNR Newmarket
 Historic Sites and Monuments Board of Canada Railway Station Report RSR-138, CNR, Newmarket, Ontario

GO Transit railway stations
Railway stations in the Regional Municipality of York
Buildings and structures in Newmarket, Ontario
Rail transport in Newmarket, Ontario
Designated heritage railway stations in Ontario
Railway stations in Canada opened in 1900